Philasteridae is a family of ciliates in the order Philasterida.

References

Further reading

External links 
 

Philasterida
Ciliate families